In baseball statistics, home run per hit (HR/H) is the percentage of hits that are home runs. It is loosely related to isolated power, which is the ability to hit for extra-base hits, including home runs. Power hitters, players who readily hit many home runs tend to have higher HR/H than contact hitters. A player hitting 30 home runs and have 150 hits in a season would have HR/H of .200, while a player who hit 8 home runs and have 200 hits in a season would have H/HR of .040.

HR/H ratio has gotten higher over time. From 1959 to 2007, HR/H for leading power hitters in MLB was .3312, with the ratio being the highest from 1995 to 2001. The highest HR/H ratio of any player was Mark McGwire at .3585 or 2.8 hits per home run.

References 

Baseball statistics